The University of New Mexico football program from 1892 to 1899 represented the represented the University of New Mexico in its first decade of intercollegiate football.

1892

The 1892 University of New Mexico football team was an American football team represented the University of New Mexico as an independent during the 1892 college football season.  The team compiled a 0–2 record. S. F. Jenkins was the team captain.

Schedule

1893

The 1893 University of New Mexico football team was an American football team represented the University of New Mexico as an independent during the 1893 college football season.  The team compiled a 3–1 record. Frederick O. Whiteman was the team captain.

Schedule

1894

The 1894 University of New Mexico football team was an American football team represented the University of New Mexico as an independent during the 1894 college football season.  The team compiled a 1–1–1 record. W. A. Zimmer was the coach, and Frederick O. Whiteman was the team captain.

Schedule

1895–1898
No varsity team

1899

The 1899 University of New Mexico football team was an American football team represented the University of New Mexico as an independent during the 1899 college football season.  The team compiled a 1–1 record.  Louie Benjamin was the team captain.

Schedule

References

1892
New Mexico
New Mexico
New Mexico
New Mexico